Harry Clode (7 September 1877 – 19 October 1964) was an English cricketer. He played 40 first-class matches for Surrey between 1899 and 1903.

See also
 List of Surrey County Cricket Club players

References

External links
 

1877 births
1964 deaths
English cricketers
Surrey cricketers
Sportspeople from Kensington
Cricketers from Greater London